Raivis Andris Jurkovskis (born 7 December 1996) is a Latvian international footballer who plays for Riga, as a left back.

Club career
Born in Liepāja, he has played club football for Liepājas Metalurgs 2, FK Liepāja and FK RFS. In January 2021 he signed for Irish club Dundalk. In December 2021, it was announced that Jurkovskis had returned to Latvia to sign for Riga.

International career
After playing for multiple Latvia national youth teams, he made his senior international debut for the Latvia in 2018.

References

1996 births
Living people
Latvian footballers
Latvia international footballers
FK Liepājas Metalurgs players
FK Liepāja players
FK RFS players
Dundalk F.C. players
Riga FC players
League of Ireland players
Association football fullbacks
Latvia youth international footballers
Latvia under-21 international footballers
Latvian expatriate footballers
Latvian expatriate sportspeople in Ireland
Expatriate association footballers in the Republic of Ireland